The Horgan ministry is the combined Cabinet (formally the Executive Council of British Columbia) that governed British Columbia from July 18, 2017, to November 18, 2022. It was chaired by the 36th premier of British Columbia, John Horgan. The Cabinet was made up of members of the British Columbia New Democratic Party (NDP), which commands a majority in the Legislative Assembly of British Columbia.

The ministry replaced the Christy Clark ministry following the aftermath of the 2017 general election. That election resulted in a hung parliament and the Clark ministry attempting to remain in office as a minority government; however, it was defeated by a motion of no confidence on June 29. As the NDP had made a confidence and supply deal with the British Columbia Green Party, enabling them to command a majority in the Legislature, Lieutenant Governor of British Columbia Judith Guichon invited Horgan to form government. The Horgan ministry was formally sworn in on July 18, 2017. The ministry governed through all but the first several weeks of the 41st Parliament of British Columbia and part of the 42nd Parliament of British Columbia, until Horgan announced his intention to retire. It was succeeded by the Eby ministry on November 18, 2022.

List of ministers

Cabinet shuffles

On October 4, 2019, Jinny Sims resigned as minister of Citizens' Services due to an on-going RCMP investigation; Selina Robinson temporarily assumed her portfolio. On January 22, 2020, Horgan appointed Anne Kang to fill the vacancy and had Michelle Mungall (then minister of Energy and Mines) and Bruce Ralston (then minister of Jobs, Economic Recovery and Innovation) swap portfolios.

Following the 2020 election, Horgan initiated a major cabinet shuffle on November 26, 2020. The cabinet expanded from 23 to 25 ministers, including Horgan. On February 25, 2022, Josie Osborne was appointed the first minister of Land, Water and Resource Stewardship; Nathan Cullen took on her prior role as minister of Municipal Affairs.

In 2022, columnist Keith Baldry noted that the Horgan ministry stood apart from its predecessors due to its "no-shuffle approach". Where it was previously unusual for a minister to stay in one portfolio for more than two or three years, the Horgan ministry had eight ministers who had held their posts for the entirety of the ministry to that point: Harry Bains (labour), Katrine Chen (child care), George Chow (trade), Adrian Dix (health), David Eby (attorney general), Mike Farnworth (solicitor general), George Heyman (environment) and Lana Popham (agriculture). Bains, Eby, Farnworth, Heyman and Popham each became the longest-serving minister of their portfolios in several decades.

On July 19, 2022, Eby stepped down from cabinet in order to stand in the 2022 British Columbia New Democratic Party leadership election; Murray Rankin stepped in as attorney general and housing minister, initially on an interim basis before being appointed to the role on an ongoing basis on August 2. On September 28, 2022, Melanie Mark resigned from cabinet to go on medical leave; Lisa Beare assumed responsibility for tourism.

Notes

References

Citations

Sources

Politics of British Columbia
Executive Council of British Columbia
2017 establishments in British Columbia
Cabinets established in 2017
Ministries of Elizabeth II
Ministries of Charles III